Goniophysetis lactealis is a moth in the family Crambidae. It is found in Kenya.

References

Endemic moths of Kenya
Cybalomiinae
Moths described in 1916